Jane Lambert is the former Australian High Commissioner to Malta with non-resident accreditation as Ambassador to Tunisia (2012-2016).  She has also served as Deputy High Commissioner to South Africa, Counselor at the Australian High Commission in Nigeria, and First Secretary at the Australian Embassy to the European Union, Belgium and Luxembourg.

Lambert earned a Bachelor of Arts degree from Flinders University, and a Master of Arts degree in Public Policy from the Australian National University.

References

Australian women ambassadors
High Commissioners of Australia to Malta
Ambassadors of Australia to Tunisia
Year of birth missing (living people)
Living people
Australian National University alumni
Flinders University alumni